Nightmare is the debut single album recorded by South Korean girl group Dreamcatcher. It is the first release from the group following the rename of the band and addition of new members, Handong and Gahyeon. The EP was released on January 13, 2017 and debuted at number 20 on the Gaon Album Chart.

Background
In mid-2016, Happy Face Entertainment announced that the group would re-brand as Dreamcatcher with two additional members; Gahyeon and Handong, In the following months, Happy Face Entertainment released an official teaser image and announced that the group will debut in the first half of 2017.

On January 13, 2017, Happy Face Entertainment released Dreamcatcher's first EP "Nightmare", with their title track "Chase Me". On January 19, they made an official debut stage at M Countdown.

Music video
The music video was released on January 13, 2017.

Release and promotion
The album released on January 13, 2017. They also had a special showcase for their debut. Their debut stage was featured in Mnet's M Countdown program.

Track listing

Charts

Release history

References

2017 debut albums
Dreamcatcher (group) albums
Korean-language albums
Single albums